The Alaska Department of Health and Social Services is a state agency of Alaska, headquartered in Juneau.

Divisions
 Alaska Division of Juvenile Justice

References

External links

 Alaska Department of Health and Social Services

Health
State departments of health of the United States
Medical and health organizations based in Alaska